Alexey Smirnov (alternatively spelled: Aleksey, Aleksei, or Alexei; Smirnov or Smirnoff) may refer to:

 Aleksei Smirnov (actor) (1920–1979), Russian actor
 Aleksei Smirnov (footballer) (born 1994), Russian football goalkeeper
 Alexei Smirnov (ice hockey) (born 1982), Russian ice hockey player
 Aleksey Smirnov (pilot) (1917–1987), flying ace and twice Hero of the Soviet Union
 Alexey Smirnov (table tennis) (born 1977), Russian table tennis player
 Alexei Smirnov (physicist) (born 1951), Russian physicist
 Alexi Smirnoff (1947-2019, as Michel Lamarche), Canadian pro-wrestler

See also
 Smirnov (surname)
 Smirnoff (surname)